Yehuda Farissol was a Jewish-Italian mathematician and astronomer. In 1499 he published a description of the astronomical sphere with diagrams, under the title Iggeret S'fira (Epistle of the Sphere).

References

15th-century Italian mathematicians
15th-century Italian Jews
Medieval Jewish astronomers
Year of birth unknown
Year of death unknown
15th-century Italian astronomers